WMTO may refer to:

 WMTO-LD (Virginia), a low-power television station (channel 6, virtual 22) licensed to serve Norfolk, Virginia, United States; see List of television stations in Virginia
 WMTO-LD (North Carolina), a defunct low-power television station (channel 11) formerly licensed to serve Manteo, North Carolina, United States